Lukáš Hruška (born 2 March 1992 in Prešov) is a Slovak football midfielder who currently plays for club ŠTK Šamorín.

Career
Hruška made his official debut for 1. FC Tatran Prešov on 16 May 2012, playing the last 13 minutes in a 0–2 away lost against FK AS Trenčín.

On 29 January 2019, Hruška joined NKP Podhale.

References

External links 
 1. FC Tatran Prešov profile
 
 Ligy.sk | Lukáš Hruška

1992 births
Living people
Association football midfielders
Slovak footballers
1. FC Tatran Prešov players
MFK Skalica players
ŠK Odeva Lipany players
FC ŠTK 1914 Šamorín players
Slovak Super Liga players
2. Liga (Slovakia) players
Sportspeople from Prešov